Old Castle Swifts Football Club, the first professional football club in Essex, was formed by Scottish shipowner Donald Currie in September 1892 as Castle Swifts Football Club. The club's first home ground, located in West Ham, was named Dunottar Park, after the Castle Line company's ship Dunottar Castle. In 1894, Old Castle Swifts merged with Old St Luke's and was renamed. The club was wound up the following season. Its demise saw several players join the newly founded Thames Ironworks, the club that was later reformed as West Ham United.

History

Formation
Old Castle Swifts Football Club was formed by Scottish shipowner Donald Currie in September 1892 as Castle Swifts Football Club. They were the works team of the ship repair yard of The Castle Shipping Line and initially the majority of the team were drawn from the mainly Scottish workforce, paid for the games they played.

Castles Swifts' first home ground, a field located opposite the West Ham Police Station in West Ham Lane, was called Dunottar Park, after the Castle Line's ship Dunottar Castle. The ground had perimeter fencing and admission was charged at 3d.

1892–1893
Castle Swifts did not remain long at Dunottar Park, having to find a new ground after a dispute with the landlord. One was soon located in fields beside Wakefield Street in East Ham, known as Temple Meadows, which lay in the grounds of Temple House, not far from East Ham railway station. The team would change into their kit in the nearby Denmark Inn (now the Denmark Arms), located on the Barking Road. The Denmark Arms would later be used by many West Ham United fans before matches at the Boleyn Ground.

In March 1893 they faced Barking Woodville in the final of the West Ham Charity Cup, held at Clapton's Spotted Dog ground.  The Swifts were two goals down before coming back to win the tie 4–2, with the goals coming from outside-right Grundy, inside forwards Mitchell and Taylor and an own goal.  A local newspaper made the following account of the final:
"After the match the crowd made a rush to the Grand Stand where the Mayor presented the large silver cup to the captain of the Castle Swifts and Mr. Comerford of the Cup Committee announced that 'the medals had not yet come to hand, but they would be forwarded to the winners as soon as possible'. With that the captain was lifted on to the shoulders of several of his followers and carried from the ground."

1893–1894
At the end of the 1893–94 season, the team merged with Old St Luke's, and the newly formed team was renamed as Old Castle Swifts, and used Old St Luke's ground in Hermit Road, Canning Town.  Hermit Road had been described as a 'cinder heap' and 'barren waste'. It was surrounded by a moat and had canvas sheeting for fencing.

1894–1895
The Swifts officially became a professional outfit in November 1894, a move made after one of their players, Cunningham, was denied a return to amateur status. The club resigned from the London FA as a result.

Their demise came at the end of March 1895 when the club became bankrupt. Following this, the club played one further game, a pre-arranged fixture against St Luke's on 16 April, under the name of Old St Luke's.

Thames Ironworks
Arnold Hills, the Chairman of Thames Ironworks and Shipbuilding Co. Ltd, saw the opportunity to fund a works side, so provided the money, in order that he may take over the tenancy of the Hermit Road ground, and Thames Ironworks was born. For the Ironworks' initial season of 1895–96, a number of Old Castle Swifts players were absorbed into the newly formed team. Among them were half-backs William Morton, Walter Parks and John Woods, forwards Jamie Lindsay and George Sage, and full-back Robert Stevenson, who became the Ironworks' first ever captain. Goalkeeper David Furnell would also eventually join Thames Ironworks in 1897. The club later became West Ham United. The light blue shirts, white shorts and scarlet socks that were worn by Thames Ironworks from the 1897–98 season, and also by the early West Ham United team, are thought to have originated with Old Castle Swifts.

Honours
 West Ham Charity Cup Winners 1892–93

Players

Notes

References

Association football clubs established in 1892
Association football clubs disestablished in 1895
Defunct football clubs in England
West Ham United F.C.
1892 establishments in England
1895 disestablishments in England
Defunct football clubs in London
Sport in the London Borough of Newham
Works association football teams in England